Leibniz Institute of Agricultural Development in Transition Economies is a research institute located in Halle (Saale), Germany. IAMO pursues basic and applied research in the field of agricultural economics. It analyses economic, social and political processes of change in the agricultural and food sector, and in rural areas. The geographic focus covers the enlarging EU, transition regions of Central, Eastern and South Eastern Europe, as well as Central and Eastern Asia.

Main research areas
IAMO analyses the political, external environment of agriculture and its scope of design, the agricultural and food sector markets, and the structural development of enterprises in rural areas. Moreover, it embraces the interdependencies of market processes, managerial decisions and policies on the environment and rural areas. Research activities of the institute are grouped to four main areas:
 Policies and institutions 
 Natural resource use 
 Livelihoods in rural areas 
 Organization of agriculture 
 Agricultural value chains

External links
 Homepage of IAMO

Organizations established in 1994
Agricultural research institutes in Germany
Buildings and structures in Saxony-Anhalt
Halle (Saale)
Leibniz Association
Economic research institutes